The Ahven-class minesweepers were a series of six minesweepers of the Finnish Navy. The ships were constructed in 1936–1937 at the Turun Veneveistämö Shipyard in Finland and saw service during World War II.  The Ahven class was stricken in 1961.

Description
The Ahven class were armed with one  gun mounted on the deck forward and had a complement of 8 officers and ratings.

Ships in class

The six Ahven-class minesweepers were:
  – renamed to 
  – renamed to 
  – renamed to 
  – renamed to 
  – renamed to 
  – renamed to

Service history
All six vessels of the class were constructed by Turun Veneveistämö Shipyard in Finland and launched in 1936–1937. Designated a motor minesweeper, the Ahven class were later renamed and were stricken in 1961.

See also
 List of ship classes of the Second World War

Notes

Citations

Sources
 
 

Ships of the Finnish Navy
Minesweepers of the Finnish Navy
Mine warfare vessel classes
Ships built in Finland